Furkat Tursunov (born 5 February 1991) is a Turkmen footballer who plays for Turkmen club Altyn Asyr. He was part of the Turkmenistan national team from 2012.

Club career 
He began his professional career in 2011 in FC Lebap. From 2013 play for FC HTTU.

International career 
Tursunow made his senior national team debut on 24 October 2012, in an 2012 VFF Cup match against Vietnam.

He played for Turkmenistan youth team in 5 matches at Commonwealth of Independent States Cup 2013., scored 1 goal to Estonia.

References

External links 

1991 births
Living people
Turkmenistan footballers
Turkmenistan international footballers
FC Altyn Asyr players
Association football defenders